Samhah or Samha is an inhabited island in the Guardafui Channel. A part of the Socotra archipelago, it is located between the island of Socotra and Somalia. Like the whole group, it belongs to Yemen  and is part of Socotra Governorate. There is a dispute between Yemen and Somalia's government over the island's sovereignty.

Statistics
It measures  in area, making it the smallest of the three inhabited islands of the group, after the main island of Socotra and Abd al Kuri. The population of some 100 lives in a village on the western part of the north coast. Samhah and neighboring Darsah ( to the east) are collectively known as "Al Akhawain" which means "The Brothers". 

Important Bird Area
The island of Samhah (along with neighbouring Darsa) has been recognised as an Important Bird Area (IBA) by BirdLife International because it supports breeding Jouanin's petrels.

References 

Socotra archipelago
Important Bird Areas of Socotra
Islands of Somalia
Disputed islands
Territorial disputes of Yemen
Territorial disputes of Somalia
Seabird colonies